The 1957 European Shooting Championships was the 2nd edition of the global shooting competition, European Shooting Championships, organised by the International Shooting Sport Federation.

Results

Men

Women

Medal table

See also
 1957 European Shotgun Championships
 European Shooting Confederation
 International Shooting Sport Federation
 List of medalists at the European Shooting Championship

References

External links
 
 European Champion Archive Results at Sport-komplett-de

European Shooting Championships
European Shooting Championships